Presto is an unincorporated community in Allegheny County, Pennsylvania, United States. Presto has a post office, with ZIP code 15142, which opened on March 3, 1903. Thoms Run, a tributary of Chartiers Creek, has its confluence here.

References

Unincorporated communities in Allegheny County, Pennsylvania
Unincorporated communities in Pennsylvania